Pareurydera spinosa is a species of beetle in the family Carabidae, the only species in the genus Pareurydera.

References

Lebiinae